Beauty Prize may refer to:

The Beauty Prize, a 1923 musical comedy, with music by Jerome Kern, book and lyrics by George Grossmith and P. G. Wodehouse 
The Beauty Prize (film), an unrelated 1924 film directed by Lloyd Ingraham and starring Viola Dana
Prix de Beauté (Beauty Prize), a 1930 film starring Louise Brooks